"Move It" is a song first released in 1958 by Cliff Richard and the Drifters

Move It may also refer to:

 "Move It", a song by the Chantays from the B-side to their 1963 hit "Pipeline" and their album Pipeline.
 "Move It", a song by Chuck Berry from his 1979 album Rockit
 Move It (game show), an Australian TV game show
 MOVE IT, a dance event held annually currently at ExCeL, London
 Move It!, an album by Reel 2 Real